The Kauai Interscholastic Federation or KIF currently consists of four high schools that sponsor a number of athletic sports, including football, basketball, volleyball and soccer.

Member institutions

References 

Hawaii high school athletic conferences